Royal Affairs in Versailles (French title: Si Versailles m'était conté) is a 1954 French-Italian historical drama directed by Sacha Guitry. Described as "a historical film showing Versailles from its beginnings to the present day", it  tells some episodes through portrayal of the personalities who lived in the Palace of Versailles. Its sister films are Napoléon (1955) and If Paris Were Told to Us (1956).

The film is notable for the presence of a great number of well-known French actors, often appearing in short parts. One unknown actor playing a major character is Gilbert Bokanowski (credited as Gilbert Boka) portraying Louis XVI. Bokanowski was actually the film's production manager and was cast because of his strong resemblance to the monarch.

Its English translation title is If Versailles Were Told to Me. Despite French production, the film is best known by its English title Royal Affairs in Versailles.

Plot
Historical human stories in connection with the Royal Palace, the Chateau of Versailles.

Cast

Michel Auclair as Jacques Damiens
Jean-Pierre Aumont as Cardinal de Rohan
Jean-Louis Barrault as François Fénelon
Jeanne Boitel as Madame de Sevigné
Annie Cordy as Madame Langlois
Gilbert Bokanowski as Louis XVI
Bourvil as museum guide
Gino Cervi as Cagliostro
Jean Chevrier as Turenne
Aimé Clariond as Rivarol
Claudette Colbert as Madame de Montespan
Nicole Courcel as Madame de Chalis
Danièle Delorme as Louison Chabray
Yves Deniaud as Le paysan
Daniel Gélin as Jean Collinet
Fernand Gravey as Molière
Sacha Guitry as old Louis XIV
Pierre Larquey as Un guide du musée de Versailles
Jean Marais as Louis XV
Georges Marchal as young Louis XIV
Lana Marconi as Marie-Antoinette
Mary Marquet as Madame de Maintenon
Gaby Morlay as Madame de la Motte
Giselle Pascal as Louise de la Vallière
Jean-Claude Pascal as Axel de Fersen
Édith Piaf as Woman of the People
Gérard Philipe as D'Artagnan
Micheline Presle as Madame de Pompadour
Jean Richard as Du Croisy/Tartuffe
Tino Rossi as Le gondolier
Raymond Souplex as Le commissaire-priseur
Jean Tissier as Le guide du musée de Versailles
Charles Vanel as Monsieur de Vergennes
Orson Welles as Benjamin Franklin
Pauline Carton as La Voisin
Jean Desailly as Marivaux
Gilbert Gil as Jean-Jacques Rousseau
Marie Mansart as Madame de Kerlor
Nicole Maurey as Mademoiselle de Fontanges
Jean Murat as Louvois
Jean-Jacques Delbo as Monsieur de la Motte
Louis Seigner as Lavoisier
Brigitte Bardot as Mademoiselle de la Rosille

Reception
It was the biggest hit of the year in France and earned an estimated $900,000 US.

References

External links
 

 
Royal Affairs in Versailles at Films de France

1954 films
1950s historical comedy-drama films
French historical comedy-drama films
Italian historical comedy-drama films
Films set in the 18th century
Films directed by Sacha Guitry
Films set in France
Cultural depictions of Louis XIV
Cultural depictions of Louis XV
Cultural depictions of Louis XVI
Films about Marie Antoinette
Cultural depictions of Madame de Pompadour
Films about Alessandro Cagliostro
Cultural depictions of Molière
Cultural depictions of Benjamin Franklin
Jean-Jacques Rousseau
1950s Italian films
1950s French films